The men's freestyle featherweight competition at the 1964 Summer Olympics in Tokyo took place from 11 to 14 October at the Komazawa Gymnasium. Nations were limited to one competitor.

Competition format

This freestyle wrestling competition continued to use the "bad points" elimination system introduced at the 1928 Summer Olympics for Greco-Roman and at the 1932 Summer Olympics for freestyle wrestling, as adjusted at the 1960 Summer Olympics. Each bout awarded 4 points. If the victory was by fall, the winner received 0 and the loser 4. If the victory was by decision, the winner received 1 and the loser 3. If the bout was tied, each wrestler received 2 points. A wrestler who accumulated 6 or more points was eliminated. Rounds continued until there were 3 or fewer uneliminated wrestlers. If only 1 wrestler remained, he received the gold medal. If 2 wrestlers remained, point totals were ignored and they faced each other for gold and silver (if they had already wrestled each other, that result was used). If 3 wrestlers remained, point totals were ignored and a round-robin was held among those 3 to determine medals (with previous head-to-head results, if any, counting for this round-robin).

Results

Round 1

 Bouts

 Points

Round 2

Six wrestlers were eliminated after two losses; a seventh man was also eliminated after a tie and a loss by fall. Baldangiin Sanjaa withdrew after the round. Thirteen wrestlers advanced to round 3, led by Ebrahim and Watanabe at 0 points.

 Bouts

 Points

Round 3

Five of the six bout losers in this round were eliminated; Tover, who had started with 1 point and thus could not be eliminated, moved to 4 points but stayed in competition. Eight men remained. Watanabe was the only wrestler to continue to have 0 points after his third win by fall. 

 Bouts

 Points

Round 4

All four bouts were determined by decision, resulting in wrestlers receiving at least 1 point. Watanabe, at 1 point, remained in the lead. Schilling's first loss was enough to eliminate him; Tovar had two losses and was also eliminated. Ebrahim and Douglas were each able to survive their first loss, at 4 and 5 points total respectively.

 Bouts

 Points

Round 5

Watanabe received his second point in a win by decision over Ivanov; the latter man moved from 2 points to 5 points and so remained in contention. The bout between Douglas and Ebrahim resulted in both wrestlers being eliminated; Douglas needed to win by fall to remain uneliminated but instead won by decision. Khokhashvili won his fifth straight decision, staying in the competition at 5 points.

 Bouts

 Points

Final round

With three remaining wrestlers, the final round was a round-robin among the medalists. Watanabe's round 5 victory over Ivanov counted. Ivanov and Khokhasvili wrestled to a draw; this would ultimately be the de facto silver/bronze match as Watanabe then defeated Khokhashvili by decision to take the gold medal. Ivanov and Khokhasvili each had 5 points in the round-robin (the tie against each other as well as a loss by decision to Watanabe), and head-to-head results (the tie) were unable to break the standings tie. The next tie-breaker was body weight; Ivanov took silver as the lighter wrestler.

 Bouts

 Points

References

Wrestling at the 1964 Summer Olympics